Freddy Morgan (1908–1990) was a Welsh boxer who held the Welsh flyweight title in 1928.

External links
 

1908 births
1990 deaths
Welsh male boxers
Flyweight boxers
Sportspeople from Rhondda Cynon Taf